Luise Brunner (25 August 1908 – 8 December 1977) was a German concentration camp guard in Auschwitz II (1942 – late 1944) and the chief oberaufseherin (chief guard) of Ravensbrück concentration camp from December 1944 to April 1945. 

Brunner was born in Aidhausen in 1908. She trained at the Ravensbruck concentration camp during June 1942, and in October of that year she was assigned to Auschwitz-Birkenau, where she rose through the ranks to become a Kommandoführerin. At Birkenau, Brunner was feared for her brutality: "A female German teacher – Drechsler – was the Lagerführerin [Stellvertretende Lagerführerin], a German woman named Brunner was the Oberapportführerin and another one called Grese was the Rapportführerin. If they noticed a shawl, a pullover, or stocking they would beat you half-dead."   

During the Seventh Ravensbrück Trial (2 July 1948 – 21 July 1948), Brunner was tried on charges of mistreatment of inmates of Allied nationality and participation in the selection of inmates for the gas chamber. She was sentenced to 3 years imprisonment.

References

Further reading
 Ebbinghaus, A.: Opfer und Täterinnen. Frauenbiographien des Nationalsozialismus. Nördlingen 1987. Reprinted 1996;  (in German)
 Schäfer, S.: Zum Selbstverständnis von Frauen im Konzentrationslager: das Lager Ravensbrück. PhD thesis 2002, TU Berlin. (PDF, 741 kB; in German).
 Taake, C.: Angeklagt: SS-Frauen vor Gericht; Bibliotheks- und Informationssystem der Univ. Oldenburg, 1998 (in German)

1908 births
1977 deaths
Female guards in Nazi concentration camps
People convicted in the Hamburg Ravensbrück trials